Ian "Scotty" Morrison (born April 22, 1930) is a Canadian former National Hockey League referee and vice-president, and the former president and chairman of the Hockey Hall of Fame.

Morrison played junior hockey in Quebec and then became a referee, working in junior and senior amateur leagues. He moved to Vancouver to work in the Western Hockey League, and from there was hired by the NHL at the age of 24, at that time the youngest referee in league history.

Morrison left the NHL in 1955 and became referee-in-chief of the Western Hockey League, while also working games as a referee. He also worked in sales, and in that job was transferred to Toronto in 1964. In June 1965, Morrison returned to the NHL as referee-in-chief. His title became vice-president of officiating in 1981. In 1986, Morrison became the NHL's vice-president of project development, assigned to the Hockey Hall of Fame where he was made president. He served in that role until 1991 when he became chairman of the Hall, while his NHL vice-president title was dropped in 1992. Morrison led the Hall of Fame through its relocation from the grounds of Exhibition Place to its present site in downtown Toronto, and retired in 1998.

Morrison was inducted into the Hockey Hall of Fame in the builders' category in 1999. He received the Wayne Gretzky International Award in 2001. He became a Stanley Cup trustee in 2002.

Personal
Morrison's son, Perry, was one of 84 workers to die aboard the oil-drilling rig Ocean Ranger when it sank with no survivors off the coast of Newfoundland in 1982.

Morrison is well known in Haliburton, Ontario for his community service. He chaired an annual hockey tournament for many years called the Scotty Morrison Charity Hockey Tournament, which raised over $700,000 for Community Care Haliburton County. In 2016, he was awarded a Sovereign’s Medal for Volunteers at the Pinestone by the local Haliburton community.

References

External links
 

1930 births
Living people
Anglophone Quebec people
Canadian ice hockey officials
Canadian people of Scottish descent
Hockey Hall of Fame employees
Hockey Hall of Fame inductees
Ice hockey people from Montreal
National Hockey League executives
National Hockey League officials